Kollakadavu is a village near Cheriyanadu, Chengannur taluk,  in Alappuzha district, in the state of Kerala, south-west India. The Achankoil River flows through the town.

References

 Villages in Alappuzha district